Rhachisaurus is a genus of the lizard family Gymnophthalmidae. The genus is monotypic, i.e. it has only one species, Rhachisaurus brachylepis. It occurs in Brazil.

References

Gymnophthalmidae
Lizard genera
Taxa named by Kátia Cristina Machado Pellegrino
Taxa named by Miguel Trefaut Rodrigues
Taxa named by Yatiyo Yonenaga-Yassuda
Taxa named by Jack W. Sites Jr.